The Transcona Railer Express are a Canadian junior ice hockey team based in Winnipeg, Manitoba, Canada. They are part of the Manitoba Major Junior Hockey League (MMJHL).

History
Formed in the fall of 2012 after the demise of the Transcona Railers (1977-2011), a group of alumni applied for membership into the MMJHL. On January 7, 2012 the league board accepted the new Transcona franchise for the 2012-13 season.

Season-by-season record
Note: GP = Games Played, W = Wins, L = Losses, T = Ties, OTL = Overtime Losses, GF = Goals for, GA = Goals against

See also
List of ice hockey teams in Manitoba

References

External links
 Transcona Railer Express
 @RailerExpress
 MMJHL
 Imperial Car Rental - Official Sponsor M.M.J.H.L.

Ice hockey teams in Winnipeg
Transcona, Winnipeg